Clive D. Bondfield (born c. 1899) was a rugby union player who represented Australia.

Bondfield, a wing, claimed one international rugby cap for Australia.

References

Australian rugby union players
Australia international rugby union players
Rugby union wings